Rachel Griffin Accurso, better known as Ms. Rachel, is an American YouTuber, social media personality, songwriter, and educator. She is best known for creating the YouTube series Songs for Littles, a children's music series focused on language development for toddlers and infants.

Life and career
Rachel Griffin Accurso got a master's degree in music education from New York University and worked as a music teacher at a public preschool in New York City before starting her YouTube channel. , she is pursuing a second master's degree in early childhood education.

She started her YouTube channel in 2019 under the name Ms. Rachel with her husband, Broadway director and composer Aron Accurso, in response to the lack of media resources for her son Thomas, who had a speech delay and did not say his first word until he was two years old. She created Songs for Littles, a children's music YouTube series made up of a combination of classic children's songs, such as nursery rhymes, and original music for toddlers and infants. It was inspired by the techniques of her son's early childhood intervention speech therapist with a focus on language development milestones and inclusive subject matter.

Songs for Littles features Accurso as the star, with her signature outfit of a pink shirt with overalls and a headband, alongside diverse cast and crew members including actress and teacher Keisha Gilles, diversity and inclusion consultant Alexa Smith, speech therapist Frida Matute, animator and editor Beth Jean, singer-songwriter Jules Hoffman, actress Natalia Kaye Clater, and Accurso's husband Aron, the last of whom writes and arranges music for the series and operates two puppet characters named Georgie and Herbie. Accurso also became popular on TikTok as Ms. Rachel, where she had over two and a half million followers by March 2023. Accurso took a break from TikTok in February 2023, citing her mental health as the reason. The break was assumed by fans to be in response to backlash from some parents on the platform against Accurso's co-star Jules Hoffman for using they/them pronouns. That same month, Accurso returned to TikTok while she and Songs for Littles were signed to Creative Artists Agency.

References

1980s births
Living people
YouTubers from New York (state)
Steinhardt School of Culture, Education, and Human Development alumni
Educators from New York City
American TikTokers
Children's entertainers
Children's musicians
21st-century American women educators
21st-century American women musicians